King and Maxwell may refer to:
King and Maxwell (book series), a book series by David Baldacci
King & Maxwell, an American television series, based on the novels
King and Maxwell (novel), a 2013 novel by David Baldacci